Three ships of the Royal Australian Navy (RAN) have been named HMAS Perth after Perth, the capital city of Western Australia.

 , a modified  light cruiser. Commissioned into the Royal Navy as HMS Amphion in 1936, she was sold to the RAN three years later. The ship served until 1 March 1942, when she was sunk during the Battle of Sunda Strait.
 , the lead ship of the  guided missile destroyers. Built as a  derivative for the RAN and commissioned in 1965, the ship served until decommissioning in 1999. She was sunk as a dive wreck off the coast of Albany, Western Australia, in 2001.
 , an  commissioned in 2006 and active as of 2022.

Battle honours
Nine battle honours have been awarded to ships named HMAS Perth.

 Atlantic 1939
 Malta Convoys 1941
 Matapan 1941
 Greece 1941
 Crete 1941
 Mediterranean 1941
 Pacific 1941–42
 Sunda Strait 1942
 Vietnam 1967–71

References

Royal Australian Navy ship names